Horsham St Faith and Newton St Faith is a civil parish in the English county of Norfolk, consisting of the former parishes of Horsham St Faith and Newton St Faith. Collectively they are known as St Faiths.
For the purposes of local government, it falls within the district of Broadland.

Horsham St Faith

The village takes its name from the River Hor, which flows through the parish on its course from Horsford to Horstead; and a Benedictine priory, founded in honour of St. Faith that, until the dissolution of the monasteries, stood there.

Norwich International Airport, which was first developed in 1939 as RAF Horsham St. Faith is close by.

The village is home to the City of Norwich Aviation Museum.

The remains of a motte and bailey castle, on the Horsford side of the A140, can reached by following a track to the north of Church Street, which joins Horsford and Horsham St Faith.

On 17 October in the early 12th century until 1872 it played host to one of the country's largest cattle fairs. This fair was held to the south of Spixworth Road around Bullock Hill and Calf Lane.

In 1894 John Thomas Spurrell, the younger son of Richard James Spurrell of Thurgarton House, inherited several thousand acres in the parish from Barbara, Countess von Rechberg (daughter of Thomas Jones, 6th Viscount Ranelagh, and the estranged wife of the Austrian statesman Count Johann Bernhard von Rechberg und Rothenlöwen). He built the manor house in the 1920s. In the 1930s part of the estate was requisitioned for the construction of the RAF airbase.

The Church of St Mary and St Andrew 

The present day church dates back to the 13th century and has undergone many changes. Much of the building was restored in 1873 with a £1400 donation from the Twinings tea family. Of interest inside the church is the rood screen, dated 1528 and adorned with 12 panels depicting saints, and the elaborate Jacobean font cover. The reredos was erected in 1929 by John and Violet Spurrell in memory of their only son, John Francis Brabazon Spurrell, who was killed by buffalo at Kibaya, Tanganyika, in 1927.

Amenities

Amenities in the locality include a community centre, primary school, doctor's surgery, two post offices– one serving each village, restaurant, and a small industrial estate. The village had two public houses; the Kings Head and the Black Swan. The former ceased trading in 2009.

Located in Manor Road, the St Faith, or Norwich and Norfolk crematorium, was established in 1937. Prior to this, the site was occupied by a Poor Law Union workhouse which was destroyed by fire in 1923. The large chapel by J P Chaplin was completed in 1936 and finished in red and mauve brick. The Commonwealth War Graves Commission placed a memorial plaque in the chapel listing 30 British service personnel who were cremated here in World War II. Notable people cremated here include two Victoria Cross recipients:

Lieutenant-Colonel Victor Buller Turner (1900–1972), whose ashes were later buried at Ditchingham.
Sergeant William Burman (1897–1974), whose ashes were later taken to Golders Green Crematorium.

Notable residents
 St. Robert Southwell - Jesuit priest, poet and martyr.

Newton St Faith

Much of the parish is given over to agriculture. Residential development is concentrated along Newton Street.

Public transport 
Bus

Services through and close to the villages are provided by First Norfolk & Suffolk, Stagecoach in Norfolk and Sanders connecting the parish to surrounding towns, villages and further afield.

Gallery

Further reading 
Horsham and Newton St Faith (Towns and Villages)
The Priory of Horsham St Faith
Drayton and St Faith Medical Practice history.
Information on the Parish Church of St Mary and St Andrew Horsham St Faith

Notes

External links

St Faith Village Website
Information on the Parish Church of St Mary and St Andrew Horsham St Faith
Horsham St Faith watermill
Geograph images

Civil parishes in Norfolk
Broadland